The Dodgeville Chronicle is a newspaper published in Dodgeville, Wisconsin. It is read throughout Iowa County, Wisconsin and surrounding counties. The chronicle also publishes a small newspaper, the Democrat-Tribune, for Mineral Point.

See also 
List of newspapers in Wisconsin

External links 
The Dodgeville Chronicle. Home page.

Iowa County, Wisconsin
Newspapers published in Wisconsin